The Versa is a right tributary of the river Po which runs through the Province of Pavia in northern Italy. It flows into the Po near Portalbera, southeast of the city Pavia.

Rivers of Italy
Rivers of Lombardy
Rivers of the Province of Pavia